The 1904 New Jersey gubernatorial election was held on November 8, 1904. Republican nominee Edward C. Stokes defeated Democratic nominee Charles C. Black with 53.50% of the vote.

General election

Candidates
Charles C. Black, member of the State Tax Board (Democratic)
George P. Herrschaft (Socialist Labor)
George A. Honnecker (Populist)
Henry R. Kearns (Socialist)
James Parker (Prohibition)
Edward C. Stokes, former State Senator for Cumberland County and candidate for U.S. Senator in 1902 (Republican)

Results

References

1904
New Jersey
Gubernatorial
November 1904 events